Füzesabony is a district in south-eastern part of Heves County. Füzesabony is also the name of the town where the district seat is found. The district is located in the Northern Hungary Statistical Region.

Geography 
Füzesabony District borders with Eger District to the north, Mezőkövesd District (Borsod-Abaúj-Zemplén County) and Tiszafüred District (Jász-Nagykun-Szolnok County) to the east, Heves District to the southwest, Gyöngyös District to the west. The number of the inhabited places in Füzesabony District is 16.

Municipalities 
The district has 1 town, 1 large village and 14 villages.
(ordered by population, as of 1 January 2012)

The bolded municipality is city, italics municipality is large village.

Demographics

In 2011, it had a population of 30,416 and the population density was 53/km².

Ethnicity
Besides the Hungarian majority, the main minorities are the Roma (approx. 3,000), German (250) and Romanian (100).

Total population (2011 census): 30,416
Ethnic groups (2011 census): Identified themselves: 29,126 persons:
Hungarians: 25,815 (88.63%)
Gypsies: 2,775 (9.53%)
Others and indefinable: 536 (1.84%)
Approx. 1,500 persons in Füzesabony District did not declare their ethnic group at the 2011 census.

Religion
Religious adherence in the county according to 2011 census:

Catholic – 15,809 (Roman Catholic – 15,694; Greek Catholic – 113);
Reformed – 1,539;
Evangelical – 45; 
other religions – 611; 
Non-religious – 3,711; 
Atheism – 185;
Undeclared – 8,516.

Gallery

See also
List of cities and towns of Hungary

References

External links
 Postal codes of the Füzesabony District

Districts in Heves County